Pixelopus is an American video game developer based in San Mateo, California, It was established in 2014 as an in-house studio for Sony Interactive Entertainment. The studio worked on games including Entwined. Their second game Concrete Genie was announced on 30 October 2017 and released on 8 October 2019.

History
In 2012, SIE's Foster City Studio (now known as San Mateo Studio)  product development group decided to work with small development teams following the success of Journey (2012) developed by the small studio, Thatgamecompany, and published by Santa Monica Studio. Soon after, SIE's Foster City sponsored a game development program for students at Carnegie Mellon University. They provided PlayStation Vitas for students to experiment with; Foster City were jubilant with students' ability in to rapidly prototype game ideas. In July 2013, Foster City offered six students from the development program at the Carnegie Mellon University and three students from San Jose State University. Additionally, a pair of industry veterans were hired to lead the 9-man team, forming Pixelopus. Dominic Robilliard is the creative director at Pixelopus.

Games

References

PlayStation Studios
Companies based in San Mateo, California
Video game companies of the United States
Video game development companies
Video game companies established in 2014
2014 establishments in California